Ntombi Valencia Khumalo is a South African politician and a member of the National Assembly of South Africa since 2021. She is a member of the Democratic Alliance.

Background
Khumalo holds a master's degree in somatology. She had worked in the somatology industry for more than a decade. She worked as the head therapist at Matispa from 2007 to 2008, when she resigned to become a lecturer at the University of Johannesburg. Khumalo later obtained a doctorate in health professions education. She has published research papers in peer-reviewed journals and presented local and international conventions as well.

Political career
In 2016, Khumalo was elected as a DA councillor in the City of Johannesburg Metropolitan Municipality. Herman Mashaba of the DA was elected mayor. He later announced the composition of his mayoral committee, in which he appointed Khumalo as the Member of the Mayoral Committee (MMC) for Corporate and Shared Services. Khumalo served in the Mayoral Committee until Mashaba resigned as mayor in November 2019 and the DA subsequently lost control of the metro.

On 18 March 2020, Khumalo was appointed as the Shadow Member of the Mayoral Committee (SMMC) for Economic Development by DA Caucus leader, Leah Knott.

Parliamentary career
In 2019, Khumalo stood for election to the South African National Assembly as 63rd on the DA's regional list and 196th on the party's national list. Due to the DA's electoral performance, she was not elected to parliament.

Gauteng DA MP Cameron Mackenzie died from COVID-19 complications in July 2021. On 9 September 2021, the DA appointed Khumalo to take up his seat in the National Assembly. She was sworn in as a Member of Parliament on 10 November 2021 by National Assembly Speaker Nosiviwe Mapisa-Nqakula.

References

External links

Living people
Year of birth missing (living people)
Place of birth missing (living people)
Zulu people
Democratic Alliance (South Africa) politicians
Members of the National Assembly of South Africa
Women members of the National Assembly of South Africa
21st-century South African politicians